Alnod John Boger  (31 August 1871 – 3 June 1940) was an English first-class cricketer and barrister.

The son of Hext Boger and Blanche Luz Bacon (daughter of Major General Anthony Bacon), he was born in August 1871 at Stonehouse, Devon. He was educated at Windlesham House School and Winchester College, before going up to Magdalen College, Oxford.

While studying at Oxford, Boger made six appearances in first-class cricket for Oxford University in 1891 and 1892. He scored a total of 143 runs in his six matches, at an average of 13.00 and a high score of 41 not out. With his right-arm slow bowling, he took 9 wickets with best figures of 6 for 63, which came against the Marylebone Cricket Club on debut in 1891. He gained a blue in cricket and represented the university in golf in 1893 and 1894.  After graduating from Oxford, he was called to the bar as a member of the Inner Temple. 

Ineligible for active service as the result of losing an eye in a shooting accident, he volunteered as an ambulance driver for the British Red Cross Society at the start of World War I and ended the conflict as a lieutenant in the Royal Naval Volunteer Reserve. He later served as a justice of the peace and was the High Sheriff of Cornwall in 1925. 

Boger died at Oxford in June 1940.

Works
 The story of General Bacon: being a short biography of a peninsula and Waterloo veteran. London: Methuen, 1903.
 The road I travelled. Bristol: Arrowsmith, 1936.

References

External links

1871 births
1940 deaths
Royal Navy officers
Military personnel from Plymouth, Devon
Cricketers from Plymouth, Devon
People educated at Winchester College
Alumni of Magdalen College, Oxford
English cricketers
Oxford University cricketers
Members of the Inner Temple
English barristers
English justices of the peace
High Sheriffs of Cornwall
People educated at Windlesham House School
Royal Navy officers of World War I
Royal Naval Volunteer Reserve personnel of World War I